Fábio Konder Comparato (born October 6, 1936) is a Brazilian lawyer, jurist and writer. He is a retired full professor of Commercial Law and Philosophy of Law at University of São Paulo. He holds a doctor's degree from University of Paris and an honorary doctorate from University of Coimbra.

References

1936 births
Living people
Recipients of the Great Cross of the National Order of Scientific Merit (Brazil)